Antonio Bartoccetti (Macerata, 18 December 1946) is an Italian musician and composer, and leader of the musical groups, Antonius Rex, Jacula, Dietro Noi Deserto and Invisible Force.

Biography 
Beginning in 1968, his primary focus has been progressive rock. His bands, notably Antonius Rex, have published numerous LPs.

In recent years, four other albums have been released on CD and digital download: Magic Ritual, Switch On Dark, Per Viam, Pre Viam. As producer, Antonio Bartoccetti has also produced all albums and singles by his son Rexanthony. He is married to musical pioneer, Doris Norton.

Discography

With Dietro Noi Deserto 

 1969 – Dentro me/Aiuto (45 RPM, Decca Records)

With Invisible Force 

 1971 – Morti vident/1999 mundi finis (single)

With Jacula 

 1969 – In Cauda Semper Stat Venenum (Black Widow Records, BWR 051)
 1972 – Tardo Pede in Magiam Versus (Rogers, TRS 010001; re-issued on CD on Mellow Records, MMP 136)
 2011 – Pre Viam (Black Widow Records, BWR 135CD)

With Antonius Rex 

 1977 – Zora (re-issued on CD in 1994 and 2010)
 1978 – Ralefun (re-issued on CD in 1994 and 2011)
 1979 – Anno Demoni (re-issued on CD in 2002)
 1980 – Praeternatural (re-issued on CD in 2003)
 2002 – Neque Semper Arcum Tendit Rex (2002)
 2005 – Magic Ritual (2005)
 2006 – Switch On Dark (2006)
 2009 – Pre Viam (2009)
 2012 – Hystero Demonopathy

References

Bibliography 
 Gino Castaldo (ed.), A Dictionary of Italian Song, Curcio , Rome, 1990; Voices of Jacula, by Roberto Ruggeri, p. 845, and Antonius Rex, by Marco Giorgi, p. 46
 Paolo Barotto, The Return of Italian Pop, Stilgraf Publishing, Luserna San Giovanni, 1989; entries re. Antonius Rex, pp. 21–22, and Jacula, pp. 64–65

External links 
 Antonius Rex Official Website
 Antonius Rex discography on ProgArchives
 
 

Progressive rock guitarists
Electronic musicians
Progressive rock musicians
Italian musicians
1946 births
Living people